Chugunov may refer to
Chugunov (surname)
Chugunov Island in Antarctica
Chugunov Glacier in Antarctica